The Vagabond Trail is a 1924 American silent Western film directed by William A. Wellman and produced and distributed by the Fox Film Corporation.

The film is based on the 1923 novel Donnegan by George Owen Baxter (aka Max Brand).

Plot
As described in a film magazine review, while playing with his younger brother Donnegan, Lord Nick is the cause of his injury and, when he learns that the youngster may die, he leaves home and becomes a vagabond. However, the boy does not die, and when he becomes older he sets out to find his older brother. He has several thrilling encounters, among which is one with a bully who shoots and wounds Donnegan rather severely. It develops after the shooting that the man who committed the crime is the brother for whom he had been searching. After a reconciliation, there is happiness among the parties.

Cast

Preservation status
With no prints of The Vagabond Trail located in any film archives, it is a lost film.

References

External links
 
 

Films directed by William A. Wellman
1924 Western (genre) films
Lost Western (genre) films
1924 films
Films based on American novels
Fox Film films
American black-and-white films
Lost American films
1924 lost films
Silent American Western (genre) films
1920s American films